Gorushka is a rural locality (a village) in Petushinskoye Rural Settlement, Petushinsky District, Vladimir Oblast, Russia. The population was 22 as of 2010. There are 12 streets.

Geography 
Gorushka is located 14 km northwest of Petushki (the district's administrative centre) by road. Saroye Annino is the nearest rural locality.

References 

Rural localities in Petushinsky District